Ombudsman was a Canadian television programme which sought to investigate and resolve disputes between people and government or business systems. When the series began, government ombudsman offices were only available in a few Canadian provinces. The initial Ombudsman episodes began mid-season in January 1974 and were broadcast fortnightly, sharing its Sunday night time slot with In the Present Tense.  Beginning with the fall 1974 season, CBC aired the series most weeks.

Lawyer Robert M. Cooper was the program's host until 1979 when he shifted his attention to film production. Kathleen Ruff was his successor in the final season. By the time CBC cancelled the series, nearly all Canadian provincial governments had opened ombudsman offices.

External links
Queen's University Directory of CBC Television Series: Ombudsman

TVarchive.ca: Ombudsman
Canadian Communications Foundation: Ombudsman

1974 Canadian television series debuts
1980 Canadian television series endings
CBC Television original programming
1970s Canadian television news shows
CBC News
1980s Canadian television news shows